Winston Preparatory School is an independent private school for students with learning differences (such as dyslexia, ADHD, and NVLD) in grades 4-12. The school has campuses in New York City; Suffolk County, New York; Norwalk, Connecticut; Whippany, New Jersey; and Marin, California. The organization also operates a post-secondary "Transitions" in New York City.

Winston Preparatory School is chartered by the State of New York and is a member of ISAAGNY, NYSAIS, NEASC, and NAIS.  The New York School is accredited by NYSAIS and NEASC.  The organization also has a research and public outreach division called the Winston Innovation Lab.

Learning Support Center
The Learning Support Center offers academic support, speech and language therapy and educational assistance for adults and K-12 students. Sessions take place after-school.

See also
 Education in Norwalk, Connecticut

References

External links
Winston Preparatory School website
Winston Preparatory School Page

Buildings and structures in Norwalk, Connecticut
Educational institutions established in 1981
Private high schools in Connecticut
Private high schools in Manhattan
Private middle schools in Connecticut
Private middle schools in Manhattan
Schools in Fairfield County, Connecticut
Special schools in the United States